Linguee is an online bilingual concordance that provides an online dictionary for a number of language pairs, including many bilingual sentence pairs. As a translation aid, Linguee differs from machine translation services like Babel Fish and is more similar in function to a translation memory. Linguee is operated by Cologne-based DeepL GmbH (formerly Linguee GmbH), which was established in Cologne in December 2008.

Technology 
Linguee uses specialized webcrawlers to search the Internet for appropriate bilingual texts and to divide them into parallel sentences. The paired sentences identified undergo automatic quality evaluation by a human-trained machine learning algorithm that estimates the quality of translation. The user can set the number of pairs using a fuzzy search, access, and the ranking of search results with the previous quality assurance and compliance is influenced by the search term. Users can also rate translations manually, so that the machine learning system is trained continuously.

Sources 
In addition to serving the bilingual Web, Patent translated texts as well as the EU Parliament protocols and laws of the European Union (EUR-Lex) as sources. In addition to officially translated text from EU sources, its French language service relies on translated texts from Canadian government documents, websites, and transcripts, along with Canadian national institutions and organisations which often provide bilingual services. According to the operator Linguee offers access to approximately 100 million translations.

History 
The concept behind Linguee was conceived in the fall of 2007 by former Google employee Gereon Frahling and developed in the following year along with Leonard Fink. The business idea was recognized in 2008 with the main prize of a competition founded by the German Federal Ministry of Economics and Technology. In April 2009, the web service was made available to the public. Linguee is operated by DeepL GmbH (formerly Linguee GmbH) based in Cologne.

In 2017, a team of Linguee employees around Jarosław Kutyłowski developed and launched the DeepL Translator, a freely-available translation service capable of translating to and from seven major European languages. Since then, DeepL was gradually expanded to offer 24 languages and 552 language pairs. With increasing focus on Kutyłowski's product (DeepL), Frahling decided in 2019 to leave the company. Kutyłowski restructured the company into the Societas Europaea DeepL SE in 2021.

See also
 Reverso (language tools), another collection of online bilingual concordances
 Translation memory
 Parallel text

References

Bibliography

External links
 

Translation databases
Natural language processing software
Computer-assisted translation